The 1969–70 Kentucky Colonels season was the third season of the Colonels in the American Basketball Association. On April 15, 1969, the Colonels were bought by a group of Louisville investors that included H. Wendell Cherry, Bill DeWitt, J. David Grissom, Stuart P. Jay, David A. Jones, John Y. Brown, Jr. and Mike Storen. The Colonels won their first ever playoff series, beating the New York Nets 4 games to 3. In the Eastern Division Finals. with the chance to go to the ABA Finals, they lost to the eventual champion Indiana Pacers 4 games to 1.

Roster
35 Darel Carrier – Shooting guard 
32 Wayne Chapman – Small forward 
-- Steve Chubin – Shooting guard 
10 Louie Dampier – Point guard
42 Ollie Darden – Power forward 
25 John Fairchild – Small forward 
40 Tommy Kron – Shooting guard 
22 Goose Ligon – Power forward 
40 Sam Little – Guard 
54 Gene Moore – Center	 
-- Willie Murrell – Small forward 
24 Bud Olsen – Power forward 
45 Bobby Rascoe – Shooting guard 
52 Sam Smith- Small forward 
25 Keith Swagerty – Power forward 
34 George Tinsley – Small forward 
34 Bobby Washington Point guard
25 Gene Williams – Forward

Final standings

Eastern Division

Playoffs
Eastern Division Semifinals

Colonels win series, 4–3

Eastern Division Finals

Colonels lose series, 4–1

Awards and honors
1970 ABA All-Star Game selections (game played on January 24, 1970)
Louie Dampier
Gene Moore
Darel Carrier
All-ABA Second Team selection
 Louie Dampier

References

 Colonels on Basketball Reference

External links
 RememberTheABA.com 1969-70 regular season and playoff results
 RememberTheABA.com Kentucky Colonels page

Kentucky Colonels seasons
Kentucky
Kentucky Colonels, 1969-70
Kentucky Colonels, 1969-70